Bardan Monastery or Bardan Gompa is a 17th-century Buddhist monastery, approximately 12 kilometres south of Padum, in Zanskar,  Ladakh, northern India at the side of the Lungnak river. The monastery also ran several smaller hermitages in the area.

The monastery consists of a large Dukhang or assembly hall which has some grand statues of Buddhist figures and several small stupas.

References

Buddhist monasteries in Ladakh
Drukpa Kagyu monasteries and temples
Tibetan Buddhist monasteries and temples in India
17th-century establishments in India